Santa Rosa Municipality may refer to:
 Santa Rosa Municipality, Beni
 Santa Rosa, Bolívar
 Santa Rosa, Cauca

Municipality name disambiguation pages